Santa Tecla BC is a Salvadoran professional basketball team that competes in the Salvadoran Liga Mayor de Baloncesto and the international Liga Centroamericana de clubes de baloncesto.

Notable players
- Set a club record or won an individual award as a professional player.
- Played at least one official international match for his senior national team at any time.
  Carlos Alas
  Lisván Valdés
  Leandro Cabrera
  Marcus Faison

References

External links
Presentation at Latinbasket.com

Basketball teams established in 2015
Basketball teams in El Salvador
La Libertad Department (El Salvador)